Robert Ouellet (born May 18, 1968) is a former Canadian–French professional ice hockey player who participated in ice hockey at the 1998 Winter Olympics as a member of the France men's national ice hockey team. He also competed with France at five Ice Hockey World Championships (1996–2000).

His son, Xavier Ouellet, is a hockey defenseman with the Montreal Canadiens of the National Hockey League. He was named to the QMJHL All-Rookie team in 2009-10.  Xavier was drafted in the 2nd round (48th overall) in the 2011 NHL Entry Draft by the Detroit Red Wings.

References

External links

1968 births
Living people
Anglet Hormadi Élite players
Brest Albatros Hockey players
Brûleurs de Loups players
Canadian ice hockey centres
Canadian people of French descent
Ducs d'Angers players
Ice hockey players at the 1998 Winter Olympics
Krefeld Pinguine players
Olympic ice hockey players of France
Saint-Jean Castors players
Ice hockey people from Montreal
Canadian expatriate ice hockey players in France
Canadian expatriate ice hockey players in Germany